Ilbisil is a settlement in Kenya's Rift Valley Province.

References 

Bisil is a savannah with beautiful vistas and from where one can see mount Kilimanjaro's snow cap on clear days. Its population is growing with upwardly mobile city dwellers seeking escape to wide open spaces and clean air.

Populated places in Kajiado County